The second season of Mongolia's Next Top Model premiered on 6 October 2018 on Edutainment TV. This is the second season of the series to be hosted model Nora Dagva.

The prizes for this cycle were a 2-year modelling contract with Brave Model Management in Milan and a cash prize of ₮20.000.000 (about US$7,600).

Eighteen-year-old Anujin Bayan-Erdene from Ulaanbaatar was crowned as the winner of the competition during a private ceremony on January 17, 2019. Chamia Chimedtseren also received a shared, posthumous first placement with Baynerdene in tribute to her memory, as she had died some months before.

Contestants
(Ages stated are at start of contest)

Episode summaries

Episode 1

Original airdate: 

This was the casting episode. The 22 semifinalists had a runway show and a photoshoot at an airport. At panel they were narrowed down to the top 16. After the casting, they move into their model villa, where they will live throughout the competition.

Episode 2

Original Airdate: October 13, 2018

The girls have their first photoshoot challenge for Innov Style clothing line & magazine, Tomi won the challenge and her photo will be in the cover of the magazine. Later, they have a beauty shoot above the water for Biomon skin care campaign, Udval fainted at the photoshoot and was rushed to the hospital, and the result that she decide to quitted during the judging. Agru and Tergel landed in bottom two. And it was Tergel was the first girl to be eliminated.

Challenge winner: Tomi Baatarchuluun
Quit: Udval Yondonpeljee
First call-out: Tomi Baatarchuluun
Bottom two: Agru T. & Tergel Munkhbayar
Eliminated: Tergel Munkhbayar

Episode 3
Original airdate: 

The girls have their makeovers. Later, the 14 contestants have a boxing photoshoot in pair. Anulan and Sainbuyan landed in bottom two. And it was Anulan was eliminated.

 Challenge winner: Chamia Chimedtseren
First call-out: Alina Dansaranova
Bottom two: Anulan Uelun & Batkhand Sainbuyan
Eliminated: Anulan Uelun

Episode 4

Original airdate: 

The girls are having a bikini wax before packed their bags for a trip to Ordos City. There, they went to the Erdeniin Tobchi movietown and have a photoshoot challenge at the temple, Misheel won the challenge and received a pair of sneakers. At night, the girls have a photoshoot where they become sexy sailor on the yacht. In the next morning, Nora just only announced the top-3 of this week, after that she call out Agru, and she decide to quit. Her quit decision has made Chamia, Goyokhon & Suvdaa upset and Nora shouted at them.

Challenge winner: Misheel Nasanjargal
First call-out: Chamia Chimedtseren
Quit: Agru T.

Episode 5
Original airdate: 

The remaining 12 girls head to the Desert Lotus Resort at Xiangshawan. There, they have a catwalk challenge in a bubble runway show over a pool, Misheel won the challenge and win a shopping spree. Later, they have a photoshoot with camel at the desert. Badmaarag, Sainbuyan and Misheel landed in bottom three. And it was Sainbuyan was eliminated.

 Challenge winner: Misheel Nasanjargal
First call-out: Anujin Baynerdene
Bottom three: Badmaarag Narmandakh, Batkhand Sainbuyan & Misheel Nasanjargal
Eliminated: Batkhand Sainbuyan

Episode 6
Original airdate: 

Challenge winner: Misheel Nasanjargal
First call-out: Beligma Yansanova
Bottom two: Badmaarag Narmandakh & Misheel Nasanjargal
Eliminated: Badmaarag Narmandakh

Episode 7
Original airdate: 

Challenge winner:  Odnoo Enkhtaiwan
First call-out: Alina Dansaranova
Bottom two: Anujin Baynerdene & Jyerri Baatarchuluun
Eliminated: Jyerri Baatarchuluun

Episode 8 
Original airdate: 

9 remaining girls heading to Arxan. They have a photoshot with wolf for Isispharma. Goyokhon and Suvdaa landed in bottom two. And it was Suvdaa was eliminated, making Goyokhon the last Chinese remaining. After the elimination, the girl went back to Ulaanbaatar.

 Challenge winner: Alina Dansaranova
 First call-out: Odnoo Enkhtaiwan
 Bottom two: Goyokhon Zinkhbagal & Suvdaa Ariuntuyaa
 Eliminated: Suvdaa Ariuntuyaa

Episode 9 
Original airdate: December 23, 2018

 Challenge winner: Chamia Chimedtseren
 First call-out: Alina Dansaranova
 Bottom two: Odnoo Enkhtaiwan & Tomi Baatarchuluun
 Eliminated: Tomi Baatarchuluun

Episode 10 
Original airdate: December 30, 2018

The girls have their photoshoot challenge as a pin-up girl with food, Alina won the challenge and won a shopping spree from Xti. Later, They met last year's winner Tserendolgor Battsenger, who tell about their next photoshoot as a fashion ice queens. Alina and Beligma landed in bottom three. And it was Beligma was eliminated, making Alina the last Russian remaining.

Challenge winner: Odnoo Enkhtaiwan
First call-out: Anujin Baynerdene
Bottom two: Alina Dansaranova & Beligma Yansanova
Eliminated: Beligma Yansanova

Episode 11 
Original airdate: January 6, 2019

The girls have their commercial challenge with some products from Ma Maison Home Decor Mongolia, Chamia won the challenge and won a shopping spree from them. They have a photoshoot and motion editorial for Baigal House in lingerie and yak at steppe. After the photoshoot, the girls have a visit for their family at the model's villa. Anujin and Goyokhon landed in bottom two. And it was Goyokhon was eliminated.

 Challenge winner: Chamia Chimedtseren
First call-out: Odnoo  Enkhtaiwan
Bottom two: Anujin Baynerdene & Goyokhon Zinkhbagal
Eliminated: Goyokhon Zinkhbagal

Episode 12 
Original airdate: January 13, 2019

Interviewed episode with the Mongolian contestant about this season.

Episode 13 
Original airdate: January 20, 2019

 Runners-up: Alina Dansaranova, Misheel Nasanjargal, & Odnoo Enkhtaiwan	  
 Winners: Anujin Baynerdene & Chamia Chimedtseren

Results

 The contestant quit the competition.
 The contestant was eliminated.
 The contestant won the competition.
 The contestant received a shared, posthumous first placement.

Photo shoots
Episode 1 photo shoot: Posing at an airport (casting) 
Episode 2 photo shoot: Beauty shot in a bathtub for Biomon Skincare
Episode 3 photo shoot: Posing in pairs in a boxing ring
Episode 4 photo shoot: Sexy sailors on a yacht
Episode 5 photo shoot: Posing with a camel in the desert
Episode 6 photo shoot: Quirky anti-gravity
Episode 7 photo shoot: Swimsuits in rock formations
Episode 8 photo shoot: Posing with a wolf for Isispharma
Episode 9 photo shoot: Posing as robot Barbies
Episode 10 photo shoot: Ice queens
Episode 11 photo shoot: Posing with a yak for Baigal House
Episode 13 photo shoot: Posing with a male model for Goyo

Controversy
Following the airing of the show's third episode, 22 year-old contestant Chamia Chimedtseren from Ulaanbaatar was found dead after allegedly suffering a fall from a height of several stories. An investigation surrounding the nature of her death was launched immediately afterward, which led to the postponing of the season after that episode.

Several weeks afterward, the show resumed airing the episodes under a regular schedule. There was a public outcry over the airing of the season, as it was unknown how far the late contestant had progressed into the competition due to the nature of the pre-recorded episodes. There was further confusion over how the season would proceed in the event that Chimedtseren had advanced into the live finale, which had yet to take place.

A private crowning ceremony, was held with the remaining four contestants on January 17, 2019. 18 year-old Anujin Baynerdene was chosen as the winner of the competition. A memorial service was held for the deceased contestant, whose family also received a posthumous award and cash prize on Chimedtseren's behalf for her efforts in the competition. The final episode aired on January 20, 2019.

Notes

References

Mongolian-language television shows
Mongolia's Next Top Model